Simon J. James is an English academic and specialist in late Victorian and Edwardian fiction, especially George Gissing and H. G. Wells. Professor of English Literature at Durham University, he is currently the Head of the Department of English Studies (2015-2018). He is  the editor of The Wellsian, the journal of the H. G. Wells Society.

As well as publishing a book on George Gissing and writing many academic articles, he has also edited four H. G. Wells novels for Penguin Classics (The History of Mr Polly, Kipps, Love and Mr Lewisham and The New Machiavelli) and has written articles for the Times Literary Supplement and the Oxford Companion to English Literature.

Published works
Unsettled Accounts: Money and Narrative in the Novels of George Gissing (London: Anthem Press, 2003)
Maps of Utopia: H. G. Wells, Modernity and the End of Culture (Oxford: Oxford University Press, 2012)

References

External links
Durham University profile
 

Year of birth missing (living people)
Living people
Academics of Durham University